The 1949 NCAA Track and Field Championships were contested at the 28th annual NCAA-hosted track meet to determine the team and individual national champions of men's collegiate track and field events in the United States. This year's meet was hosted by the University of Southern California at the Los Angeles Memorial Coliseum in Los Angeles.

Hosts USC claimed the team national championship, their thirteenth title (and first since winning nine consecutive titles between 1935 and 1943).

Team Result 
 Note: Top 10 only
 (H) = Hosts

See also 
 NCAA Men's Outdoor Track and Field Championship
 1948 NCAA Men's Cross Country Championships

References

NCAA Men's Outdoor Track and Field Championship
NCAA Track and Field Championships
NCAA